Francis Davis is an American author and journalist.

Francis Davis may also refer to:
Francis Davis (poet) (1810–1881), Irish poet and editor
Sir Francis Boileau Davis, 2nd Baronet (1871–1896), of the Davis baronets

See also

Frank Davis (disambiguation)
Francis Davies (disambiguation)